Garmdarreh Rural District is in the Central District of Karaj County, Alborz province, Iran. At the census of 2006, its population was 544 in 138 households, and in the most recent census of 2016, it had decreased to 221 in 75 households. The largest of its 13 villages was Shahrak-e Taleqani, with 111 people.

References 

Karaj County

Rural Districts of Alborz Province

Populated places in Alborz Province

Populated places in Karaj County